The British Judo Championships are held annually and feature various age and weight categories to determine the British champion. The Championships are currently held at the English Institute of Sport, Sheffield. 

Until 2013, the Championships were held under the title of either the British Closed Championships or the British Senior Trials. In 2013, the British Closed Championships/Senior Trials were merged with the all-age British Championships. The 2020 Championship was cancelled due to the COVID-19 pandemic.

Past winners (1974-1975)

Men

Past winners (1976-1996)

Men

Women

Past winners (1997-present)

Men

Women

References

Judo competitions in the United Kingdom